Ishkinovo (İşken) is a rural locality (a village) in Uralsky Selsoviet, Uchalinsky District, Bashkortostan, Russia. The population was 186 as of 2010. There are 5 streets.

Geography 
Ishkinovo is located 36 km southwest of Uchaly (the district's administrative centre) by road. Uralsk is the nearest rural locality.

References 

Rural localities in Uchalinsky District